Robert Shogan (September 12, 1930 – October 30, 2013) was an American journalist and author. He spent more than 25 years at the Washington bureau of The Los Angeles Times. He also worked for The Detroit Free Press, Newsweek, and The Wall Street Journal.  He taught at Johns Hopkins University, among other institutions.

Books
Shogan wrote many works of historical nonfiction and media criticism.  Particularly praised was The Battle Of Blair Mountain: The Story Of America's Largest Labor Uprising, published in 2004.  Kirkus Reviews called it "a stunning re-creation of the great West Virginia uprising of 1921 . . . crackingly told."  The Journal of Appalachian Studies declared that "among other successes, this book presents a valuable short history of the U.S. labor movement and its discontents through crystalline evocations of figures like Samuel Gompers, John L. Lewis, the Wobblies, and Mother Jones." Greil Marcus, in a revised edition of The Old, Weird America: The World of Bob Dylan's Basement Tapes, cited it as a worthy source about the Battle of Blair Mountain.

Publishers Weekly wrote that Bad News: Where the Press Goes Wrong in the Making of the President, published in 2001, was a "carefully crafted retrospective on the media and presidential campaigns since JFK . . . a highly readable chronicle." Reviewing 1991's The Riddle of Power: Presidential Leadership From Truman to Bush, The New York Times stated that it was "on balance . . . a lively and straightforward primer on leadership."

Selected bibliography
The Detroit Race Riot: A Study in Violence, with Tom Craig (1964)
A Question of Judgment: The Fortas Case and the Struggle for the Supreme Court (1972)
Promises to Keep: Carter's First Hundred Days (1977)
Riddle of Power: Presidential Leadership from Truman to Bush (1991)
Hard Bargain: How FDR Twisted Churchill's Arm, Evaded the Law, and Changed the Role of the American Presidency (1995)
Bad News: Where the Press Goes Wrong in the Making of the President (2001)
The Battle Of Blair Mountain: The Story Of America's Largest Labor Uprising (2004)
No Sense of Decency: The Army-McCarthy Hearings: A Demagogue Falls and Television Takes Charge of American Politics (2009)
Prelude to Catastrophe: FDR's Jews and the Menace of Nazism (2010)
Harry Truman and the Struggle for Racial Justice (2013)

References

External links

American male journalists
20th-century American non-fiction writers
21st-century American non-fiction writers
1930 births
2013 deaths
21st-century American male writers
20th-century American male writers